Mikhail Youzhny is a Russian retired professional tennis player who has won ten ATP singles titles, and nine ATP doubles titles in his career to date.

During his junior career, Youzhny peaked at number 20 in the world junior rankings in early 2000, the year after reaching the boys' singles final at the 1999 Australian Open, losing to Kristian Pless of Denmark. He turned professional later in 1999, winning four futures tournaments to start his career. He started played on the ATP Challenger Circuit the same year, and won his first Challenger tournament in July 2000 against Jan Frode Andersen from Norway. While he debuted at the ATP World Tour in 1999, Youzhny won his first ATP title in July 2002 at the Mercedes Cup against Guillermo Cañas from Argentina.

Youzhny has reached the quarterfinals of all four Grand Slams, as of 2013 only 11 other active players have managed to do the same. He has reached a Grand Slam semifinal twice, both at the US Open, in 2006 and 2010. While chiefly a singles player, Youzhny has reached the quarterfinals of a grand slam in doubles twice, at the 2006 US Open and the 2014 Australian Open. He debuted within the top 10 in January 2008, but ended the year as a top 10 player for the only time in his career in 2010. As of 2020, Youzhny is second most successful Russian tennis player in history if considering match wins only, trailing behind Yevgeny Kafelnikov.

Keys

ATP career finals

Singles: 21 (10 titles, 11 runner-ups)

Doubles: 12 (9 titles, 3 runner-ups)

ATP Challenger Tour

Singles: 6 (5 title, 1 runner-up)

Doubles: 2 (1 title, 1 runner-up)

ITF Men's Circuit

Singles: 4 (4 titles)

Doubles 1 (1 title)

ITF Junior Circuit

Singles: 2 (1 title, 1 runner-up)

Doubles: 4 (3 titles, 1 runner-up)

Singles Grand Slam seedings

Performance timelines

Singles

Doubles

Top 10 wins

Singles

Doubles

National participation

Davis Cup

Wins: 2

Participations: 38 (21 wins, 17 losses)

   indicates the result of the Davis Cup match followed by the score, date, place of event, the zonal classification and its phase, and the court surface.

Summer Olympics matches

Singles (5 wins, 3 losses)

Doubles (2 wins, 3 losses)

References
Notes

1. Russia did not participate in the World Group Play-offs in those years.

General
Career finals, Grand Slam seedings, information for both the singles and doubles performance timelines, top 10 wins and national participation information have been taken from these sources:

 
  
  
  
  
  
  
  
  
  
  
  
  
  
  
  
  

  
  
  
  
  
  
  
  
  
  
  
  
  
  
 

Specific

Youzhny, Mikhail